Medak Fort is situated in Medak district in the Indian state of Telangana, about 100 kilometres from the state capital, Hyderabad. Medak fort was constructed by the Kakatiya Kings. The fort lies to the north of the city and can be reached by road. It is a citadel built on a hillock that provided as a vantage point for the Kakatiya rulers in medieval India. 

The fort was built sometime around the 12th century and during the reign of the Kakatiya ruler, Rudra Deva and was called Methuku durgam, meaning cooked rice in Telugu. It was later ruled by another great South Indian kingdom kings the Musunuri Kings. It was a command  post of the Kakatians and later for Musunuri Kings and Qutb Shahis. The fort has great historical and architectural importance in Telangana.   Within the fort is a 17th-century Mosque built by the Qutub Shahis, granaries and remains of grand houses.

It has three main entrances, the "Prathama Dwaram", the "Simha Dwaram" that has two snarling lions at the top of the entrance and the "Gaja Dwaram", or Elephant's Entrance that has a sculpture of two elephants interlocked on both sides of the entrance. The main entrance proudly displays the double-headed "Gandabherundam" of the Kakatiyas.
The wood used as a support for the stable roof(Terminalia paniculata) can still be seen there.

At the fort one can see a 17th-century cannon that is 3.2 metres long. The cannon has a trident etched on it. This fortress uses the natural topography to the maximum advantage with the rocky face offering it natural defences. The water to the fort was provided via a pipeline.  

Now, there is not much left to see, but as it stands on a hillock, it offers a good view of the district.

References

Forts in Telangana
Medak district